The world records in swimming are ratified by FINA, the international governing body of swimming. Records can be set in long course (50 metres) or short course (25 metres) swimming pools. FINA recognizes world records in the following events for both men and women, except for the mixed relays, where teams consist of two men and two women, in any order.
 Freestyle: 50m, 100m, 200m, 400m, 800m, 1500m
 Backstroke: 50m, 100m, 200m
 Breaststroke: 50m, 100m, 200m
 Butterfly: 50m, 100m, 200m
 Individual medley: 100m (short course only), 200m, 400m
 Relays: 4×50m freestyle relay (short course only), 4×100m freestyle, 4×200m freestyle, 4×50m medley relay (short course only), 4×100m medley
 Mixed relays: 4×50m mixed freestyle (short course only), 4×100m mixed freestyle (long course only), 4×50m mixed medley (short course only), 4×100m mixed medley (long course only)

The ratification process is described in FINA Rule SW12, and involves submission of paperwork certifying the accuracy of the timing system and the length of the pool, satisfaction of FINA rules regarding swimwear and a negative doping test by the swimmer(s) involved. Records can be set at intermediate distances in an individual race and for the first leg of a relay race. Records which have not yet been fully ratified are marked with a '#' symbol in these lists.

Many of the records below were established by swimmers wearing bodysuits or suits made of polyurethane or other non-textile materials allowed in the race pool from February 2008 until December 2009. On the eve of the 2009 FINA World Championships in Rome, the international governing body for five Olympic aquatic sports voted to ban the use of bodysuits and all suits made of non-textile materials starting 1 January 2010. The suits seemed to improve the performance in those with larger physiques, boosting performance in some athletes more than others, depending on morphology and physiology. Since then, best times set by swimmers wearing textile materials have once again overtaken more than half of the world records recognized by FINA.

On 25 July 2013, FINA Technical Swimming Congress voted to allow world records in the long course mixed 400 free relay and mixed 400 medley relay, as well as in six events in short course meters: the mixed 200 medley and 200 free relays, as well as the men's and women's 200 free relays and the men's and women's 200 medley relays. In October 2013, FINA decided to establish "standards" before something can be recognized as the first World Record in these events. But later on 13 March 2014 FINA has officially ratified the eight world records set by Indiana University swimmers at the IU Relay Rally held on 26 September 2013 in Bloomington.

Long course (50m pool)

Men

ss - supersuited/non-textile world record

Men's records by race distance

Women

ss - supersuited/non-textile world record

Mixed relay

Short course (25m pool)

Men

Women

Mixed relay

Record holders' rankings

By nation

By athlete (men)

By athlete (women)

References

External links
 FINA swimming world records

World
Swimming
World records